Stan Wawrinka defeated the defending champion Novak Djokovic in the final, 6–7(1–7), 6–4, 7–5, 6–3 to win the men's singles tennis title at the 2016 US Open. It was his third Grand Slam title; on all three occasions he defeated the world No. 1 player in the final. Wawrinka saved a match point en route to the title, against Dan Evans in the third round. Djokovic became the third man in the Open Era (after Ivan Lendl and Andy Murray) to lose five finals at the same major.

This was the first US Open since 1999 not to feature five-time champion Roger Federer. This was the first major that Tomáš Berdych, then the world No. 8, missed ever since his debut at the 2003 US Open, ending his streak of 52 consecutive Grand Slam appearances (sixth-highest of all-time).

No American player was seeded inside the top 16 for the first time since the introduction of the seeding system in 1930.  Steve Johnson was the top-seeded American male at No. 19.

Seeds

Qualifying

Draw

Finals

Top half

Section 1

Section 2

Section 3

Section 4

Bottom half

Section 5

Section 6

Section 7

Section 8

Seeded players
Seeds are based on the ATP and WTA rankings as of August 22, 2016. Rank and points before are as of August 29, 2016.

Withdrawn players
The following players would have been seeded, but they withdrew from the event.

Other entry information

Wild cards

Protected ranking

Qualifiers

Lucky losers

Withdrawals
 Before the tournament

During the tournament
  Jiří Veselý (left forearm inflammation)

Retirements

Notes

References

External links
 Men's Singles main draw
2016 US Open – Men's draws and results at the International Tennis Federation

Men's Singles
US Open - Men's Singles
US Open (tennis) by year – Men's singles